Sandrine Testud was the defending champion, but was defeated by Martina Hingis in the semifinals.

Hingis went on to win the title, defeating Mary Pierce in the final 6–4, 6–1.

Seeds

Draw

Finals

Top half

Bottom half

Qualifying

Seeds

Qualifiers

Lucky losers

Qualifying draw

First qualifier

Second qualifier

Third qualifier

Fourth qualifier

References
 ITF singles results page

Singles
Porsche Tennis Grand Prix - Singles